Janet Ann Sanderson (born 1955) is a former American diplomat and an adjunct professor of international relations at Georgetown University. During her 34-year career as a foreign service officer, she served as U.S. Ambassador to Haiti and U.S. Ambassador to Algeria, among other assignments.  While Ambassador to Haiti her administration was subject to multiple Inspector's General queries but no adverse actions were ever taken.

Prior to joining the foreign service in 1977, she earned a B.A. from the College of William and Mary, and a master's degree in national security studies from the Naval War College.

She served as the Deputy Assistant Secretary of State for Near East Affairs in the U.S. State Department from July 2009 – August 2011.(2 years 2 months)

References

External links

1955 births
Living people
College of William & Mary alumni
United States Foreign Service personnel
Naval War College alumni
American women ambassadors
Ambassadors of the United States to Algeria
Ambassadors of the United States to Haiti
20th-century American diplomats